Woodlands railway station was on the Schull and Skibbereen Railway in County Cork, Ireland from 1886 to 1947.

History
The station opened on 6 September 1886.

Regular passenger services were withdrawn on 27 January 1947.

Routes

References

Further reading

Disused railway stations in County Cork
Railway stations opened in 1886
Railway stations closed in 1947